This is a list of foreign players in K League 1.

 Players in bold are currently playing in K League 1.
 Nationality is listed under the official K League player registration; players may acquire multiple citizenship.
 If players have been capped for a national team, this nationality takes precedence over the nationality stated in the official K League player registration database.
 In dual citizen annotation, if dual citizen players have an international career, the country listed in italics is the national team they have played for.

Africa (CAF)

Cameroon 
 Gustave Bollanga Priso (1996 Jeonbuk Hyundai Dinos)
 Bertin Tomou (1997 Pohang Steelers)
 Gilbert Massock (1997 Anyang LG Cheetahs)
 Michel Pensée (1997–1999 Cheonan Ilhwa Chunma)
 Claude Parfait Ngon A Djam (1999 Cheonan Ilhwa Chunma)
 Nicolas Alain Noudjeu Mbianda (2000 Jeonbuk Hyundai Motors)
 Same Nkwelle Corentin (2002 Daejeon Citizen)
 Felix Nzeina (2005 Busan IPark)
 Emile Mbamba (2009 Daegu FC)

DR Congo 
 Emeka Mamale (1996–1997 Pohang Steelers)
 Jean-Kasongo Banza (1997 Jeonnam Dragons, 1997 Cheonan Ilhwa Chunma)
 Zazi Chaminga Adrien (1997 Cheonan Ilhwa Chunma)
 Mutamba Kabongo (1997–2000 Anyang LG Cheetahs)
 N'Dayi Kalenga (1999 Cheonan Ilhwa Chunma)
 Paul-José M'Poku (2023–present Incheon United)

Cote d'Ivoire
 Jean-Marc Benie Bolou (2000 Seongnam Ilhwa Chunma)
 Loukou Auguste (2000 Seongnam Ilhwa Chunma)

Egypt
 Mohamed Azima (1996 Ulsan Hyundai Horang-i)

Gambia
 Modou Barrow (2020–2022 Jeonbuk Hyundai Motors) ※ Dual citizen of Gambia and Sweden

Ghana
 George Alhassan (1984 Hyundai Horang-i)
 Stanley Aborah (1997–1998 Cheonan Ilhwa Chunma)
 Patrick Villars (2003 Bucheon SK)
 Alex Asamoah (2010 Gyeongnam FC)
 Derek Asamoah (2011–2012 Pohang Steelers, 2013 Daegu FC) ※ Dual citizen of Ghana and the United Kingdom

Guinea
 Abdoul Salam Sow (1996 Jeonnam Dragons)

Guinea-Bissau
 Frédéric Mendy (2016 Ulsan Hyundai, 2017 Jeju United) ※ Dual citizen of Guinea-Bissau and France

Mali
 Cheick Tidiani Dao (2002 Bucheon SK)
 Cheick Oumar Dabo (2002–2004 Bucheon SK)

Mauritius
 Geovanni Jeannot (1996–1997 Ulsan Hyundai Horang-i)

Niger
 Olivier Bonnes (2016–2017 Gwangju FC); also played in K League 2 ※ Dual citizen of Niger and France

Nigeria
 Alex Agbo (1997 Cheonan Ilhwa Chunma)
 Ajibade Babalade (1997 Anyang LG Cheetahs)
 Victor Shaaka (1997–1999 Anyang LG Cheetahs, 1999–2000 Ulsan Hyundai Horang-i, 2001–2002 Busan I'Cons)
 John Zaki (2000 Jeonbuk Hyundai Motors)
 Lucky Isibor (2000 Suwon Samsung Bluewings)
 Obinna John Nkedoi (2002 Daejeon Citizen)
 Augustine James (2003 Bucheon SK)
 Lanre Kehinde (2019–2020 Incheon United)
 Christian Osaguona (2019 Jeju United)
 Moses Ogbu (2022 Pohang Steelers) ※ Dual citizen of Nigeria and Sweden

Senegal
 Papa Oumar Coly (2001–2003 Daejeon Citizen)

Sierra Leone
 Mahmadu Alphajor Bah (1997–1998 Jeonnam Dragons)

South Africa
 Lars Veldwijk (2020 Jeonbuk Hyundai Motors, 2021–present Suwon FC); also played in K League 2 ※ Dual citizen of South Africa and the Netherlands

Asia (AFC)

Australia
 Greg Brown (1991 POSCO Atoms)
 Ahmad Elrich (2004 Busan I'Cons)
 Antun Kovacic (2009 Ulsan Hyundai)
 Jade North (2009 Incheon United)
 Saša Ognenovski (2009–2012 Seongnam Ilhwa Chunma)
 Iain Fyfe (2011 Busan IPark)
 Luke DeVere (2011–2014 Gyeongnam FC)
 Robert Cornthwaite (2011–2014 Jeonnam Dragons)
 Matt McKay (2012 Busan IPark)
 Eddy Bosnar (2012–2013 Suwon Samsung Bluewings)
 Nathan Burns (2012–2013 Incheon United)
 Matt Simon (2012–2013 Jeonnam Dragons)
 Brendan Hamill (2012–2014 Seongnam Ilhwa Chunma / Seongnam FC, 2013 Gangwon FC)
 Adrian Madaschi 2012–2013 Jeju United)
 Alex Wilkinson (2012–2015 Jeonbuk Hyundai Motors)
 Aleksandar Jovanovic (2014–2015 & 2017–2019 Jeju United); also played in K League 2
 Adrian Leijer (2016 Suwon FC); also played in K League 2
 Erik Paartalu (2016 Jeonbuk Hyundai Motors)
 Tomislav Mrcela (2016–2018 Jeonnam Dragons) ※ Dual citizen of Australia and Croatia
 Bruce Djite (2016 Suwon FC); also played in K League 2
 Matthew Jurman (2017–2018 Suwon Samsung Bluewings)
 Connor Chapman (2017 Incheon United, 2018 Pohang Steelers, 2021 FC Seoul); also played in K League 2
 Dimitri Petratos (2017 Ulsan Hyundai)
 Ivan Franjic (2017 Daegu FC)
 Dylan McGowan (2018 Gangwon FC)
 Kwabena Appiah (2018 Incheon United) ※ Dual citizen of Australia and New Zealand
 James Donachie (2018 Jeonnam Dragons)
 Bernie Ibini-Isei (2019 Jeonbuk Hyundai Motors)
 Adam Taggart (2019–2020 Suwon Samsung Bluewings)
 Rashid Mahazi (2019–2020 Incheon United) ※ Dual citizen of Australia and Kenya
 Jason Davidson (2019–2021 Ulsan Hyundai)
 Terry Antonis (2019–2021 Suwon Samsung Bluewings)
 Brandon O'Neill (2020 Pohang Steelers)
 Alex Grant (2021–present Pohang Steelers)
 Harrison Delbridge (2021–present Incheon United)
 Lachlan Jackson (2021–present Suwon FC)
 Ben Halloran (2022 FC Seoul)
 Aaron Calver (2023–present Gwangju FC); also played in K League 2

China 
 Wan Houliang (2009 Jeonbuk Hyundai Motors)
 Feng Xiaoting (2009 Daegu FC, 2010 Jeonbuk Hyundai Motors)
 Li Weifeng (2009–2010 Suwon Samsung Bluewings)
 Li Chunyu (2010 Gangwon FC)
 Yan Song (2010 Jeju United)
 Bai Zijian (2011 Daejeon Citizen)
 Huang Bowen (2011–2012 Jeonbuk Hyundai Motors)

East Timor 
 Rodrigo Souza Silva (2017 Daegu FC); when Rodrigo was registered in K League, he was a dual citizen of East Timor and Brazil. He was declared ineligible to participate for the representative teams of the East Timor Football Federation.

Iran
 Khaled Shafiei (2017 FC Seoul)

Iraq
 Abbas Obeid Jassim (1996–1997 Anyang LG Cheetahs, 1997–2001 Pohang Steelers)
 Sadiq Saadoun Ridha (1996 Anyang LG Cheetahs)
 Ali Abbas Al-Hilfi (2016–2017 Pohang Steelers) ※ Dual citizen of Iraq and Australia
 Jiloan Hamad (2019 Incheon United)  ※ Dual citizen of Irag and Sweden

Japan
 Kojiro Kaimoto (2001–2002 Seongnam Ilhwa Chunma)
 Masakiyo Maezono (2003 Anyang LG Cheetahs, 2004 Incheon United)
 Kazuyuki Toda (2009 Gyeongnam FC)
 Masahiro Ohashi (2009, 2011 Gangwon FC)
 Kazunari Okayama (2009–2010 Pohang Steelers)
 Naohiro Takahara (2010 Suwon Samsung Bluewings)
 Yuta Baba (2011–2013 Daejeon Citizen)
 Akihiro Ienaga (2012 Ulsan Hyundai)
 Yusuke Shimada (2012 Gangwon FC)
 Sergio Escudero (2012–2015 FC Seoul, 2018 Ulsan Hyundai) ※ Dual citizen of Japan and Spain
 Chikashi Masuda (2013–2014 & 2015–2016 Ulsan Hyundai); also played in K League 2
 Yojiro Takahagi (2015–2016 FC Seoul)
 Tomoki Wada (2015 Incheon United, 2016–2017 Gwangju FC); also played in K League 2
 Takuma Abe (2017 Ulsan Hyundai)
 Yohei Toyoda (2018 Ulsan Hyundai)
 Takahiro Kunimoto (2018–2019 Gyeongnam FC, 2020–2022 Jeonbuk Hyundai Motors)
 Tsubasa Nishi (2018–2021 Daegu FC); also played in K League 2
 Takumi Kiyomoto (2019 Gangwon FC)
 Takahiro Nakazato (2019–2020 Gangwon FC)
 Masatoshi Ishida (2021 Gangwon FC, 2023–present Daejeon Hana Citizen); also played in K League 2
 Keita Suzuki (2022–present Daegu FC)
 Yuki Kobayashi (2022 Gangwon FC); also played in K League 2
 Jun Amano (2022 Ulsan Hyundai, 2023–present Jeonbuk Hyundai Motors)
 Manabu Saitō (2022 Suwon Samsung Bluewings)
 Keijiro Ogawa (2022 FC Seoul)
 Ataru Esaka (2023–present Ulsan Hyundai)

Korea DPR
 Ryang Kyu-sa (2001 Ulsan Hyundai Horang-i)
 Kim Myong-hwi (2002 Seongnam Ilhwa Chunma)
 An Yong-hak (2006–2007 Busan IPark, 2008–2009 Suwon Samsung Bluewings)
 Jong Tae-se (2013–2015 Suwon Samsung Bluewings)
 An Byong-jun (2022–present Suwon Samsung Bluewings); also played in K League 2

Palestine
 Éder (2017 Jeonbuk Hyundai Motors); also played in K League 2 ※ Dual citizen of Palestine and Brazil

Philippines 
 Álvaro Silva (2015 Daejeon Citizen); also played in K League 2 ※ Dual citizen of the Philippines and Spain

Saudi Arabia
 Naji Majrashi (2011 Ulsan Hyundai)

Syria
 Hosam Aiesh (2023–present FC Seoul) ※ Dual citizen of Syria and Sweden

Tajikistan
 Valeri Sarychev (1992–1998 Ilhwa Chunma / Cheonan Ilhwa Chunma, 2000–2004 Anyang LG Cheetahs / FC Seoul) ※ Dual citizen of Tajikistan and South Korea
 Vitaliy Parakhnevych (1995–1998 Jeonbuk Hyundai Dinos, 1998–2000 Suwon Samsung Bluewings, 2001 Anyang LG Cheetahs, 2002 Bucheon SK) ※ Dual citizen of Tajikistan and Ukraine

Thailand
 Piyapong Pue-on (1984–1986 Lucky-Goldstar Hwangso)
 Sasalak Haiprakhon (2021 Jeonbuk Hyundai Motors)

Uzbekistan
 Server Djeparov (2010–2011 FC Seoul, 2013–2014 Seongnam Ilhwa Chunma / Seongnam FC, 2015 Ulsan Hyundai)
 Timur Kapadze (2011 Incheon United)
 Alexander Geynrikh (2011 Suwon Samsung Bluewings)
 Ikromjon Alibaev (2019–2021 FC Seoul, 2023–present Gangwon FC); also played in K League 2
 Rustam Ashurmatov (2020 Gwangju FC, 2021 Gangwon FC); also played in K League 2
 Dostonbek Tursunov (2020 Busan IPark)
 Jamshid Iskanderov (2020–present Seongnam FC)
 Islom Kenjabaev (2021 Jeju United)

Vietnam
 Lương Xuân Trường (2016 Incheon United, 2017 Gangwon FC)
 Nguyễn Công Phượng (2019 Incheon United)

Europe (UEFA)

Albania
 Adnan Oçelli (1996 Suwon Samsung Bluewings)
 Sokol Cikalleshi (2012 Incheon United)
 Jasir Asani (2023–present Gwangju FC)

Armenia
 Karapet Mikaelyan (1997 Bucheon SK)

Austria
 Richard Windbichler (2017–2018 Ulsan Hyundai, 2021 Seongnam FC)
 Lukas Hinterseer (2021 Ulsan Hyundai)

Azerbaijan
 Anton Kryvotsyuk (2023–present Daejeon Hana Citizen)

Belarus
 Valery Vyalichka (1996 Cheonan Ilhwa Chunma)

Belgium
 Rubenilson Monteiro Ferreira (1997–1998 Cheonan Ilhwa Chunma) ※ Dual citizen of Belgium and Brazil
 Kevin Oris (2012 Daejeon Citizen, 2013 Jeonbuk Hyundai Motors, 2015–2016 Incheon United)
 Karel De Smet (2013 Daejeon Citizen)
 Marvin Ogunjimi (2016 Suwon FC)

Bosnia and Herzegovina
 Amir Teljigović (1994–1996 Daewoo Royals / Busan Daewoo Royals)
 Dragan Škrba (1995–1997 Pohang Steelers)
 Simo Krunić (1996 Pohang Atoms)
 Alen Avdić (2001–2002, 2003 Suwon Samsung Bluewings)
 Slaviša Mitrović (2002 Suwon Samsung Bluewings)
 Jasmin Mujdža (2002 Seongnam Ilhwa Chunma) ※ Dual citizen of Bosnia and Herzegovina and Croatia
 Ivan Medvid (2002–2003 Pohang Steelers) ※ Dual citizen of Bosnia and Herzegovina and Croatia
 Nikola Vasiljević (2006–2007 Jeju United)
 Jusuf Dajić (2008 Jeonbuk Hyundai Motors)
 Samir Bekrić (2010 Incheon United)
 Muhamed Džakmić (2011–2012 Gangwon FC)
 Jovica Stokić (2014 Jeju United)
 Gordan Bunoza (2017–2020 Incheon United) ※ Dual citizen of Bosnia and Herzegovina and Croatia
 Elvis Sarić (2018–2019, 2022 Suwon Samsung Bluewings)
 Sulejman Krpić (2020 Suwon Samsung Bluewings)
 Mario Kvesić (2021 Pohang Steelers) ※ Dual citizen of Bosnia and Herzegovina and Croatia

Bulgaria
 Filip Filipov-Ficho (1992–1993 & 1998–1999 Yukong Elephants / Buchoen SK)
 Slavchev Toshev (1993 Yukong Elephants)
 Dimitar Ivanov (1998 Bucheon SK)
 Iliyan Mitsanski (2015 Suwon Samsung Bluewings)
 Momchil Tsvetanov (2021–2022 Gangwon FC)

Croatia
 Dževad Turković (1996, 1997–1999 Busan Daewoo Royals, 2000–2001 Busan I'Cons, 2001 Seongnam Ilhwa Chunma)
 Jasenko Sabitović (1998–2002 Pohang Steelers, 2003–2005 Seongnam Ilhwa Chunma, 2005–2007 Suwon Samsung Bluewings, 2008 Jeonnam Dragons)
 Branko Hucika (1999–2000 Ulsan Hyundai Horang-i)
 Fabijan Komljenović (2000 Pohang Steelers)
 Saša Milaimović (2000–2001 Pohang Steelers)
 Darko Čordaš (2001 Pohang Steelers)
 Mario Ivanković (2001–2002 Suwon Samsung Bluewings)
 Joško Jeličić (2002 Pohang Steelers)
 Leonard Bisaku (2002 Pohang Steelers, 2003 Seongnam Ilhwa Chunma)
 Boris Raić (2003–2005 Bucheon SK)
 Josip Šimić (2004 Ulsan Hyundai Horang-i)
 Jasmin Agić (2005–2006 Incheon United)
 Mato Neretljak (2005–2008 & 2011 Suwon Samsung Bluewings)
 Frane Čačić (2007 Busan IPark)
 Antonio Franja (2007–2008 Jeonbuk Hyundai Motors)
 Stipe Lapić (2009–2011 Gangwon FC)
 Krunoslav Lovrek (2010–2011 Jeonbuk Hyundai Motors)
 Mateas Delić (2011–2012 Gangwon FC)
 Sandi Križman (2014 Jeonnam Dragons)
 Edin Junuzović (2014 Gyeongnam FC)
 Mislav Oršić (2015–2016 Jeonnam Dragons, 2017–2018 Ulsan Hyundai)
 Matej Jonjić (2015–2016 Incheon United)
 Ivan Kovačec (2015–2017 Ulsan Hyundai, 2017–2018 FC Seoul)
 Vedran Jugović (2016–2018 Jeonnam Dragons)
 Damir Šovšić (2017 Suwon Samsung Bluewings); also played in K League 2 ※ Dual citizen of Croatia and Bosnia and Herzegovina
 Ivan Herceg (2018 Gyeongnam FC); also played in K League 2
 Tomislav Kiš (2020 Seongnam FC)

Cyprus
 Valentinos Sielis (2017–2019 Gangwon FC); also played in K League 2

Czech Republic
 Petr Gottwald (1998 Jeonbuk Hyundai Dinos)
 Radek Divecký (2000 Jeonnam Dragons)
 František Koubek (2000–2001 Anyang LG Cheetahs)
 Petr Fousek (2001 Jeonnam Dragons)
 Tomáš Janda (2001 Anyang LG Cheetahs)
 Jan Kraus (2003 Daegu FC)
 Roman Gibala (2003 Daegu FC)

Denmark
 Henrik Jørgensen (1996 Suwon Samsung Bluewings)
 Sebastian Grønning (2022 Suwon Samsung Bluewings)

England
 Dalian Atkinson (2001 Daejeon Citizen, 2001 Jeonbuk Hyundai Motors)
 Jamie Cureton (2003 Busan I'Cons)
 Andy Cooke (2003–2004 Busan I'Cons)
 Chris Marsden (2004 Busan I'Cons)
 Richard Offiong (2005 Jeonnam Dragons)
 Jordon Mutch (2019 Gyeongnam FC)

Finland
 Jukka Koskinen (1999 Anyang LG Cheetahs)
 Urho Nissilä (2022 Suwon FC)

France
 Eric Obinna Chukwunyelu (2008 Daejeon Citizen) ※ Dual citizen of France and Nigeria
 Kevin Hatchi (2009 FC Seoul)
 Jonathan Nanizayamo (2017 Gangwon FC)

Georgia
 Valeri Qazaishvili (2021–present Ulsan Hyundai)

Germany
 Dietmar Schacht (1985 POSCO Atoms)
 Frank Lieberam (1992 Hyundai Horang-i)
 Paulo Rink (2004 Jeonbuk Hyundai Motors) ※ Dual citizen of Germany and Brazil
 Stanislav Iljutcenko (2019–2020 Pohang Steelers, 2021–2022 Jeonbuk Hyundai Motors, 2022–present FC Seoul) ※ Dual citizen of Germany and Russia
 Igor Jovanović (2020 Seongnam FC) ※ Dual citizen of Germany and Croatia

Hungary
 István Nyúl (1990 Lucky-Goldstar Hwangso)
 László Pecha (1990–1991 POSCO Atoms)
 Géza Mészöly (1990–1991 POSCO Atoms)
 Lajos Zentai (1991 LG Cheetahs)
 Zoltán Aczél (1991 Daewoo Royals)
 Attila Kámán (1994–1995 Yukong Elephants)
 József Somogyi (1994–1995 & 1996–1997 Yukong Elephants / Bucheon SK)
 Róbert Feczesin (2017 Jeonnam Dragons)
 Márk Koszta (2022 Ulsan Hyundai)
 Martin Ádám (2022–present Ulsan Hyundai)

Italy 
 Diego Giaretta (2011 Incheon United) ※ Dual citizen of Italy and Brazil
 André Moritz (2015 Pohang Steelers) ※ Dual citizen of Italy and Brazil
 Nicolao Dumitru (2021 Suwon Samsung Bluewings) ※ Dual citizen of Italy and Romania
 Boadu Maxwell Acosty (2023–present Suwon Samsung Bluewings) ※ Dual citizen of Italy and Ghana; also played in K League 2

Latvia
 Ēriks Pelcis (1999–2000 Anyang LG Cheetahs)

Lithuania
 Rolandas Karčemarskas (2000–2002 Bucheon SK)

Moldova
 Boris Tropaneț (1996 Bucheon SK)
 Alexandru Popovici (2001 Seongnam Ilhwa Chunma)
 Ion Testemițanu (2001, 2004 Seongnam Ilhwa Chunma)

Montenegro
※ Includes players who joined in Federal Republic of Yugoslavia (1992–2003) and Serbia and Montenegro (2003–2006) period
 Boro Janičić (1994–1995 LG Cheetahs)
 Željko Bajčeta (1994 LG Cheetahs)
 Saša Petrović (1996–1997 Jeonnam Dragons)
 Aleksandar Vlahović (1997 Busan Daewoo Royals)
 Dženan Radončić (2004–2007 & 2008 Incheon United, 2009–2011 Seongnam Ilhwa Chunma, 2012–2013 Suwon Samsung Bluewings)
 Dejan Damjanović (2007 Incheon United, 2008–2013 & 2016–2017 FC Seoul, 2018–2019 Suwon Samsung Bluewings, 2020 Daegu FC)
 Bogdan Milić (2012 Gwangju FC); also played in K League 2
 Ivan Vuković (2013–2014 Seongnam Ilhwa Chunma / Seongnam FC)
 Stefan Nikolić (2014 Incheon United)
 Filip Kasalica (2014–2015 Ulsan Hyundai)
 Vladan Adžić (2016 Suwon FC, 2019 Pohang Steelers); also played in K League 2
 Stefan Mugoša (2018–2022 Incheon United)
 Dino Islamović (2022–present Gangwon FC) ※ Dual citizen of Montenegro and Sweden
 Balša Sekulić (2022 Gangwon FC)
 Miloš Raičković (2022 Seongnam FC)

Netherlands
 Rob Landsbergen (1984–1985 Hyundai Horang-i)
 Sander Oostrom (1997–1998 Pohang Steelers)
 Kiki Musampa (2008 FC Seoul) ※ Dual citizen of the Netherlands and DR Congo
 Bas van den Brink (2011 Busan IPark)
 Romeo Castelen (2016 Suwon Samsung Bluewings)
 Dave Bulthuis (2019–2021 Ulsan Hyundai, 2022–present Suwon Samsung Bluewings)
 Luc Castaignos (2019 Gyeongnam FC); also played in K League 2
 Timo Letschert (2023–present Gwangju FC)

North Macedonia
※ Known as Macedonia before 2019
 Saša Ilić (1995–1997 Daewoo Royals / Busan Daewoo Royals)
 Žanko Savov (1995–1998 Jeonbuk Dinos / Jeonbuk Hyundai Dinos)
 Goran Petreski (2001–2004 Pohang Steelers)
 Blaže Ilijoski (2006 Incheon United, 2010 Gangwon FC)
 Stevica Ristić (2007–2008 Jeonbuk Hyundai Motors, 2008–2009 Pohang Steelers, 2011–2013 Suwon Samsung Bluewings, 2015–2016 Jeonnam Dragons)
 Slavčo Georgievski (2009 Ulsan Hyundai Horang-i)
 Dragan Čadikovski (2009–2010 Incheon United)
 Dušan Savić (2010 Incheon United)
 Krste Velkoski (2016 Incheon United)

Northern Ireland
 Niall McGinn (2017 Gwangju FC)

Norway
 Jon Olav Hjelde (2003 Busan I'Cons)
 Bjørn Maars Johnsen (2020 Ulsan Hyundai) ※ Dual citizen of Norway and the United States

Poland
 Leszek Iwanicki (1989 Yukong Elephants)
 Tadeusz Świątek (1989–1991 Yukong Elephants)
 Witold Bendkowski (1990–1992 Yukong Elephants)
 Krzysztof Kasztelan (1992 Yukong Elephants)
 Oskar Zawada (2021 Jeju United)

Portugal
 Rui Esteves (1997–1998 Busan Daewoo Royals)
 Edmilson (2002–2005 Jeonbuk Hyundai Motors) ※ Dual citizen of Portugal and Brazil
 Simao Costa (2001 Daejeon Citizen)
 Pedro Filipe Franco (2005 FC Seoul)
 Ricardo Nascimento (2005–2007 FC Seoul)
 Ricardo Esteves (2010 FC Seoul)
 Ricardo Barros (2017 Gwangju FC)
 Gerso Fernandes (2021–2022 Jeju United, 2023–present Incheon United) ※ Dual citizen of Portugal and Guinea-Bissau

Romania
 Marcel Lăzăreanu (1990–1991 Ilhwa Chunma)
 Pavel Badea (1996–1998 Suwon Samsung Bluewings)
 Constantin Barbu (1997 Suwon Samsung Bluewings)
 Cosmin Olăroiu (1997–2000 Suwon Samsung Bluewings)
 Mihai Drăguș (1998 Suwon Samsung Bluewings)
 Cristian Dulca (1999 Pohang Steelers)
 Iulian Arhire (1999 Pohang Steelers)
 Ion Ionuț Luțu (2000–2002 Suwon Samsung Bluewings)
 Gabriel Popescu (2002–2004 Suwon Samsung Bluewings)
 Adrian Mihalcea (2005 Jeonnam Dragons)
 Marian Aliuță (2005 Jeonnam Dragons)
 Adrian Neaga (2005–2006 Jeonnam Dragons, 2006–2007 Seongnam Ilhwa Chunma)
 Ianis Zicu (2012 Pohang Steelers, 2012–2013 Gangwon FC)
 Sergiu Buș (2021 Seongnam FC)

Russia
 Sergey Agashkov (1992 POSCO Atoms)
 Mikhail Nikolayevich Solovyov (1992 Ilhwa Chunma)
 Almir Kayumov (1993 Daewoo Royals)
 Yevgeny Zhirov (1994 LG Cheetahs)
 Aleksei Sudarikov (1994 LG Cheetahs)
 Aleksandr Podshivalov (1994–1997 Yukong Elephants / Bucheon SK)
 Kirill Varaksin (1995 Yukong Elephants)
 Yuri Shishkin (1995 Jeonnam Dragons)
 Gennadi Styopushkin (1995–1996 Ilhwa Chunma / Cheonan Ilhwa Chunma, 1997 Anyang LG Cheetahs)
 Aleksei Prudnikov (1995–1998 Jeonbuk Hyundai Dinos)
 Aleksey Shchigolev (1996 Bucheon Yukong)
 Sergey Burdin (1996–1997 Bucheon SK, 1999–2000 Seongnam Ilhwa Chunma)
 Dmitri Karsakov (1996 Bucheon Yukong)
 Valeri Shmarov (1996 Jeonnam Dragons)
 Yevgeni Kuznetsov (1996 Jeonnam Dragons)
 Yuri Matveyev (1996–1997 Suwon Samsung Bluewings)
 Boris Vostrosablin (1997–1998 Bucheon SK)
 Denis Laktionov (1996–2002 Suwon Samsung Bluewings, 2003–2005 Seongnam Ilhwa Chunma, 2005 Busan IPark, 2006–2007 Suwon Samsung Bluewings, 2012–2013 Gangwon FC)
 Oleg Yeryomin (1997 Pohang Steelers)
 Oleg Elyshev (1997–1999 Anyang LG Cheetahs)
 Andrei Solomatin (2004 Seongnam Ilhwa Chunma)

Serbia
※ Includes players who played during the Federal Republic of Yugoslavia (1992–2003) and Serbia and Montenegro (2003–2006) period
 Nebojša Vučićević (1991–1993 Daewoo Royals)
 Rade Bogdanović (1992–1996 Pohang Atoms)
 Zoran Kuntić (1993 POSCO Atoms)
 Zoran Vukčević (1993 Hyundai Horang-i)
 Goran Jevtić (1993–1995 Hyundai Horang-i)
 Aleksandar Jozević (1993 Daewoo Royals)
 Đorđe Vasić (1994 Ilhwa Chunma)
 Nebojša Maksimović (1994 Ilhwa Chunma)
 Željko Simović (1994 Daewoo Royals)
 Jovan Šarčević (1994–1995 LG Cheetahs)
 Boško Minić (1995 Jeonnam Dragons)
 Saša Drakulić (1995–1998 Busan Daewoo Royals, 1998–2000 Suwon Samsung Bluewings, 2001–2003 Seongnam Ilhwa Chunma)
 Ljubiša Ranković (1995–1996 Ilhwa Chunma / Cheonan Ilhwa Chunma)
 Nenad Nonković (1995–1996 Ilhwa Chunma / Cheonan Ilhwa Chunma)
 Branko Božović (1996 Ulsan Hyundai Horang-i)
 Dražen Podunavac (1996 Busan Daewoo Royals)
 Zoran Đurišić (1996 Ulsan Hyundai Horang-i)
 Radivoje Manić (1996–1997 & 1999–2002 Busan Dawoo Royals / Busan I'Cons, 2004–2005 Incheon United)
 Radmilo Mihajlović (1997 Pohang Steelers)
 Rahim Beširović (1998–1999 Busan Daewoo Royals)
 Zoran Novaković (1998–1999 Busan Daewoo Royals)
 Branko Radovanović (1999 Busan Daewoo Royals)
 Mirko Jovanović (1999–2000 Jeonbuk Hyundai Motors)
 Zoran Milošević (1999–2001 Jeonbuk Hyundai Motors)
 Zoran Urumov (1999–2003 Busan I'Cons, 2003–2004 Suwon Samsung Bluewings)
 Nemanja Dančetović (2000 Ulsan Hyundai Horang-i)
 Zoltan Sabo (2000–2002 Suwon Samsung Bluewings)
 Dragan Stojisavljević (2000–2001 & 2003–2004 Anyang LG Cheetahs / FC Seoul, 2004 Incheon United)
 Dušan Šimić (2003 Busan I'Cons)
 Đorđe Tomić (2004 Incheon United)
 Miodrag Anđelković (2004 Incheon United)
 Dragan Mladenović (2006–2009 Incheon United)
 Ivan Perić (2007 Jeju United)
 Željko Kalajdžić (2007 Incheon United)
 Aleksandar Petrović (2008–2009 Jeonbuk Hyundai Motors, 2009 Jeonnam Dragons)
 Borko Veselinović (2008–2009 Incheon United)
 Lazar Popović (2009 Daegu FC)
 Stevan Račić (2009 Daejeon Citizen)
 Ognjen Koroman (2009–2010 Incheon United)
 Vladimir Jovančić (2012 Seongnam Ilhwa Chunma)
 Zoran Rendulić (2012 Pohang Steelers)
 Miloš Bosančić (2013–2014 Gyeongnam FC)
 Sreten Sretenović (2013–2014 Gyeongnam FC)
 Milan Bubalo (2013 Gyeongnam FC)
 Nikola Komazec (2014 Busan IPark)
 Miloš Stojanović (2014 Gyeongnam FC); also played in K League 2
 Lazar Veselinović (2015–2016 Pohang Steelers)
 Dalibor Veselinović (2017 Incheon United)
 Uroš Đerić (2018–2019 Gangwon FC, 2019 Gyeongnam FC, 2021 Suwon Samsung Bluewings); also played in K League 2
 Bojan Matić (2018 FC Seoul)
 Aleksandar Pešić (2019–2020 FC Seoul)
 Aleksandar Paločević (2019–2020 Pohang Steelers, 2021–present FC Seoul)
 Vladimir Silađi (2021 Gangwon FC)
 Fejsal Mulić (2021–2022 Seongnam FC, 2023–present Suwon Samsung Bluewings)

Slovenia
 Sebastjan Cimirotič (2005 Incheon United)

Spain
 Fabián Caballero (2007 Daejeon Citizen) ※ Dual citizen of Spain and Argentina
 Osmar (2014–2017 & 2019–present FC Seoul)
 Urko Vera (2015 Jeonbuk Hyundai Motors)
 Jaime Gavilán (2016 Suwon FC); also played in K League 2

Sweden
 Marcus Nilsson (2017 Pohang Steelers)
 Jonathan Ring (2022–present Jeju United)
 Kevin Höög Jansson (2022–present Gangwon FC)
 Darijan Bojanić (2023–present Ulsan Hyundai)
 Gustav Ludwigson (2023–present Ulsan Hyundai)

Switzerland
 Danijel Subotić (2017 Ulsan Hyundai)

Turkey
 Seyit Cem Ünsal (1997–1998 Anyang LG Cheetahs)
 Mustafa Gönden (2002–2003 Bucheon SK)
 Rahim Zafer (2003 Daegu FC)
 Alpay Özalan (2004 Incheon United)
 Ceyhun Eriş (2008 FC Seoul)

Ukraine
 Andriy Sydelnykov (1995–1996 Jeonnam Dragons)
 Volodymyr Savchenko (1996 Anyang LG Cheetahs)
 Serhiy Skachenko (1996–1997 Anyang LG Cheetahs, 1997 Jeonnam Dragons)
 Serhiy Konovalov (1996–1998 Pohang Steelers)
 Artem Yashkin (2004 Bucheon SK)
 Borys Tashchy (2021 Pohang Steelers) ※ Dual citizen of Ukraine and Bulgaria

North America, Central America and Caribbean (CONCACAF)

Canada
 Doneil Henry (2020–2021 Suwon Samsung Bluewings)

Costa Rica
 Jeaustin Campos (1995–1996 LG Cheetahs / Anyang LG Cheetahs)
 Elias Aguilar (2018 Incheon United, 2019 Jeju United, 2020–2022 Incheon United); also played in K League 2
 Marco Ureña (2020 Gwangju FC)

Martinique
 Mathias Coureur (2019 Seongnam FC) ※ Dual citizen of Martinique and France

United States
 Jeff Yoo (2000 Ulsan Hyundai Horang-i, 2001 Bucheon SK)
 Mix Diskerud (2018–2019 Ulsan Hyundai) ※ Dual citizen of United States and Norway

South America (CONMEBOL)

Argentina
 Rubén Bernuncio (1993–1994 Daewoo Royals)
 Hugo Smaldone (1993 Daewoo Royals)
 Walter Perazzo (1994 Daewoo Royals)
 Ruben Rossi (1994 Daewoo Royals)
 Leonardo Torres (2001 Jeonbuk Hyundai Motors)
 Javier Musa (2004–2005 Suwon Samsung Bluewings, 2005 Ulsan Hyundai Horang-i)
 Lucio Filomeno (2005 Busan IPark)
 Lucas Basualdo (2010 Daegu FC)
 Victor Isaac (2010 Daegu FC)
 Pitu Garcia (2016–2017 Seongnam FC)
 Enzo Maidana (2017 Incheon United)

Bolivia
 Juan Arce (2008 Seongnam Ilhwa Chunma)

Brazil
 Jose Roberto Alves (1983 POSCO Dolphins) ※ First foreign player
 Sergio Luis Cogo (1983 POSCO Dolphins) ※ First foreign player
 Julio César Guterres (1984 POSCO Dolphins)
 Luis ? (1984 POSCO Dolphins)
 Wilsinho (1984 POSCO Dolphins)
 Zézé Gomes (1984 POSCO Dolphins)
 Flávio Almeida (1985 POSCO Atoms)
 Paulo Roberto Rocha (1985–1986 POSCO Atoms)
 Perivaldo Dantas (1987 Yukong Elephants)
 Ronaldo (1994 Hyundai Horang-i)
 Pires (1994 Hyundai Horang-i)
 Ricardo da Silva Costa (1994 POSCO Atoms)
 Silvan Lopes (1994–1995 Pohang Atoms)
 Maurício (1994–1995 Ulsan Hyundai Horang-i)
 Marcos Lueders Severo (1995 Hyundai Horang-i)
 Alaor Palacio Júnior (1996 Suwon Samsung Bluewings)
 Cleomir (1997 Jeonnam Dragons)
 Maciel Luiz Franco (1997–2003 Jeonnam Dragons)
 José Adao Fonseca (1998 Jeonnam Dragons)
 Marcelo Sander (1998 Bucheon SK)
 Carbone (1999 Jeonnam Dragons)
 Rémerson dos Santos (1999–2000 Ulsan Hyundai Horang-i)
 Cezinha (1999–2002 Jeonnam Dragons)
 Rogerio Prateat (1999–2002 Jeonbuk Hyundai Motors, 2003 Daegu FC)
 Dimas (2000 Jeonnam Dragons)
 Josimar (2000 Pohang Steelers)
 Joílson (2000 Seongnam Ilhwa Chunma)
 Silva (2000 Seongnam Ilhwa Chunma)
 André (2000–2002 Anyang LG Cheetahs)
 Ricardo Campos (2000–2004 Anyang LG Cheetahs / FC Seoul, 2005–2006 Seongnam Ilhwa Chunma, 2006 Busan IPark)
 Sandro Cardoso (2000–2002, 2005–2006 Suwon Samsung Bluewings, 2006–2007 Jeonnam Dragons)
 Boiadeiro (2001 Pohang Steelers)
 Ricardo Silva ? (2001 Pohang Steelers)
 Claudio Celio Cunha Defensor (2001 Ulsan Hyundai Horang-i)
 Rincon (2001 Jeonbuk Hyundai Motors)
 Sérgio (2001 Anyang LG Cheetahs)
 Renato Olegario De Almeida (2001 Busan I'Cons)
 Arinélson Freire Nunes (2001 Jeonbuk Hyundai Motors, 2002 Ulsan Hyundai Horang-i)
 Marcos (2001–2002 Ulsan Hyundai Horang-i)
 Marcos Paulo Paulini (2001–2002 Ulsan Hyundai Horang-i)
 Iván (2001–2002 Jeonnam Dragons)
 Cléber (2001–2003 Ulsan Hyundai Horang-i)
 Tico (2001–2003 Jeonnam Dragons)
 Julinho Vieira (2001–2002 Jeonbuk Hyundai Motors, 2003–2004 Jeonnam Dragons)
 Irineu Ricardo (2001–2004) Seongnam Ilhwa Chunma, 2004–2007 Bucheon SK / Jeju United FC
 Didi (2002 Busan I'Cons)
 Jorginho (2002 Pohang Steelers)
 Kuki (2002 Jeonbuk Hyundai Motors)
 Léomar Leiria (2002 Jeonbuk Hyundai Motors)
 Marco (2002 Anyang LG Cheetahs)
 Alcir (2002 Seongnam Ilhwa Chunma)
 Paulo César (2002 Seongnam Ilhwa Chunma)
 Silva (2002 Jeonnam Dragons)
 Tuta (2002 Anyang LG Cheetahs, 2003 Suwon Samsung Bluewings)
 Edmilson Alves (2002–2003 Ulsan Hyundai Horang-i)
 Alison Barros Moraes (2002–2003 Ulsan Hyundai Horang-i, 2003–2005 Daejeon Citizen)
 Raphael Botti (2002–2006 Jeonbuk Hyundai Motors)
 Agnaldo Cordeiro Pereira (2003 Anyang LG Cheetahs)
 Alex Oliveira (2003 Daejeon Citizen)
 Balão (2003 Ulsan Hyundai Horang-i)
 Carlos (2003 Jeonbuk Hyundai Motors)
 Cassiano (2003 Pohang Steelers)
 Grafite (2003 Anyang LG Cheetahs)
 José (2003 Pohang Steelers)
 Lúcio (2003 Ulsan Hyundai Horang-i)
 Luís Mário (2003 Anyang LG Cheetahs)
 Magno Alves (2003 Jeonbuk Hyundai Motors)
 Michel Neves Dias (2003 Jeonnam Dragons)
 Rodrigo Fernandes Valete (2003 Jeonbuk Hyundai Motors)
 Victor (2003 Anyang LG Cheetahs)
 Dodô (2003–2004 Ulsan Hyundai Horang-i)
 Rodrigo (2003–2004 Daejeon Citizen)
 Indio (2003 Pohang Steelers, 2003–2005 Daegu FC)
 Itamar (2003–2004 Jeonnam Dragons, 2005 Pohang Steelers, 2005–2006 Suwon Samsung Bluewings, 2006–2007 Seongnam Ilhwa Chunma)
 Nadson (2003–2005, 2007 Suwon Samsung Bluewings)
 Santos (2003–2005 Pohang Steelers, 2006–2008 Gyeongnam FC)
 Eninho (2003 Suwon Samsung Bluewings, 2007–2008 Daegu FC, 2009–2013 & 2015 Jeonbuk Hyundai Motors)
 Adhemar (2004 Seongnam Ilhwa Chunma)
 Adriano Magrão (2004 Busan I'Cons)
 Allan Rodrigo Aal (2004 Daejeon Citizen)
 Caio (2004 Jeonnam Dragons)
 Cristiano Ávalos (2004 Suwon Samsung Bluewings)
 Daniel Mendes (2004 Ulsan Hyundai Horang-i)
 Danilo (2004 Daegu FC)
 Edu Sales (2004 Jeonbuk Hyundai Motors)
 Flamarion (2004 Daejeon Citizen)
 Celso Sas Neves (2004 Busan I'Cons)
 Gaúcho (2004 Busan I'Cons)
 José Fernando Fumagalli (2004 FC Seoul)
 Marcel (2004, 2011 Suwon Samsung Bluewings)
 Marcelo (2004 Seongnam Ilhwa Chunma)
 Marcelo Souza (2004 FC Seoul)
 Renaldo (2004 FC Seoul)
 Rinaldo Santana (2004 FC Seoul)
 Roma (2004 Jeonbuk Hyundai Motors)
 Mário Sérgio (2004 Ulsan Hyundai Horang-i)
 Tiago Cipreste Pereira (2004 Daejeon Citizen)
 Valentim (2004 FC Seoul)
 Zé Carlos (2004 Pohang Steelers)
 Henrique (2004–2005 Daejeon Citizen)
 Jefferson Feijão (2004 Daegu FC, 2005 Seongnam Ilhwa Chunma)
 Luís André Gomes (2004 Jeonbuk Hyundai Motors, 2005 Pohang Steelers)
 Nonato (2004 Daegu FC, 2005 FC Seoul)
 Petrony Santiago Barros (2004–2005 Daegu FC)
 William Souza (2004 Ulsan Hyundai Horang-i, 2007 Busan IPark)
 André Luiz Tavares (2004–2007 Pohang Steelers)
 Luciano Valente (2004 Daejeon Citizen, 2005 Busan IPark, 2006 Gyeongnam FC, 2007 Busan IPark)
 Dudu (2004–2006 Seongnam Ilhwa Chunma, 2006–2007 FC Seoul, 2008 Seongnam Ilhwa Chunma)
 Zé Carlos (2004–2005 Ulsan Hyundai Horang-i, 2006–2008 Jeonbuk Hyundai Motors)
 Mota (2004 Jeonnam Dragons, 2005–2009 Seongnam Ilhwa Chunma, 2010–2011 Pohang Steelers)
 Agos (2005 Bucheon SK)
 César (2005 Jeonbuk Hyundai Motors)
 Da Silva (2005 FC Seoul)
 Fábio Junior (2005 Jeonnam Dragons)
 Fábio Pereira (2005 Jeonnam Dragons)
 Fabrício (2005 Seongnam Ilhwa Chunma)
 Jorge Luiz Barbieri (2005 Ulsan Hyundai Horang-i)
 Luciano Ratinho (2005 Daejeon Citizen)
 Marlon Augusto Brandão (2005 Daegu FC)
 Silva ? (2005 Daegu FC)
 Moreira (2005 Jeonbuk Hyundai Motors)
 Neto Baiano (2005 Jeonbuk Hyundai Motors)
 Reinaldo de Souza (2005 Ulsan Hyundai Horang-i)
 Ricardo Villar (2005 Jeonnam Dragons)
 Sérgio Júnior (2005 Bucheon SK)
 Thiago Gentil (2005 Daegu FC)
 Wellington Gonçalves Amorim (2005 Pohang Steelers)
 Da Silva (2005 Pohang Steelers, 2005 Busan IPark, 2006 Jeju United)
 Marco Antônio (2005–2006 Jeonbuk Hyundai Motors)
 Leandrão (2005 Daejeon Citizen, 2006 Ulsan Hyundai Horang-i, 2007 Jeonnam Dragons)
 Leandro Machado (2005–2007 Ulsan Hyundai Horang-i)
 Popo (2005–2006 Busan IPark, 2007 Gyeongnam FC)
 Selmir (2005–2006 Incheon United, 2006 Jeonnam Dragons, 2007 Daegu FC, 2008 Daejeon Citizen)
 Sandro Hiroshi (2005 Daegu FC, 2006–2008 Jeonnam Dragons, 2009 Suwon Samsung Bluewings)
 Carlos Frontini (2006–2007 Pohang Steelers) ※ Dual citizen of Brazil and Argentina
 Gefferson Goulart (2006 Busan IPark)
 Dinei (2006 Daegu FC)
 Edu (2006 Daejeon Citizen)
 Eduardo Marques (2006 Daegu FC)
 Gabriel Lima (2006 Daegu FC)
 Jefferson Gama Rodrigues (2006 Daegu FC)
 Luciano Henrique (2006 Pohang Steelers)
 Marco (2006 Jeju United) 
 Regis Pitbull (2006 Daejeon Citizen)
 Robson Souza (2006 Daejeon Citizen)
 Silva (2006 Suwon Samsung Bluewings)
 Somália (2006 Busan IPark)
 Vinícius (2006 Ulsan Hyundai Horang-i)
 Denilson (2006–2007 Daejeon Citizen, 2008–2009 Pohang Steelers)
 Adriano Chuva (2006, 2007 Daejeon Citizen, 2008–2010 Jeonnam Dragons, 2011 Pohang Steelers, 2012 Gwangju FC)
 Adilson dos Santos (2006–2013 FC Seoul)
 Alex Oliveira (2007 Jeju United)
 Cabore (2007 Gyeongnam FC)
 Ciel (2007 Busan IPark)
 Cléber Schwenck Tiene (2007 Pohang Steelers)
 Fernando (2007 Busan IPark)
 Fernando (2007 Daejeon Citizen)
 Jonhes (2007 Pohang Steelers)
 Mauricio Fernandes (2007 Pohang Steelers)
 Ricardinho (2007–2008 Jeju United)
 Victor Simões (2007–2008 Jeonnam Dragons)
 Brasília (2007 Daejeon Citizen, 2008 Ulsan Hyundai Horang-i, 2009 Pohang Steelers, 2009 Jeonbuk Hyundai Motors)
 Edu (2007–2009 Suwon Samsung Bluewings, 2015 & 2016–2017 Jeonbuk Hyundai Motors)
 Luizinho (2007 Daegu FC, 2008–2009 Ulsan Hyundai Horang-i, 2011 Incheon United)
 Almir (2007 & 2008–2009 Ulsan Hyundai Horang-i, 2010 Pohang Steelers, 2011 Incheon United)
 Alexsandro (2008 Daegu FC)
 Clodoaldo (2008 Pohang Steelers)
 Edson Araújo (2008 Daejeon Citizen)
 Fabiano Gadelha (2008 Pohang Steelers)
 Geovane (2008 Daegu FC)
 Jou Silva (2008 Daegu FC)
 Josiesley Ferreira Rosa (2008 Ulsan Hyundai Horang-i)
 Leandro Bernardi Silva (2008 Daegu FC)
 Paty (2008 Jeju United)
 Pedrão (2008 Seongnam Ilhwa Chunma)
 Pingo (2008 Busan IPark)
 Reinaldo Mineiro (2008 Busan IPark)
 Renato Netson Benatti (2008 Jeonnam Dragons)
 Sousa (2008 Busan IPark)
 Souza (2008 Jeju United)
 Waldir Lucas Pereira (2008 Suwon Samsung Bluewings)
 Walter Minhoca (2008 Daejeon Citizen)
 Wellington Silva (2008 Gyeongnam FC)
 Almir (2008 Gyeongnam FC, 2014 Ulsan Hyundai); also played in K League 2
 Di Fabio (2008–2009 Busan IPark)
 Paulinho Guará (2008–2009 Busan IPark)
 Rômulo Marques Macedo (2008 Jeju United, 2009–2010 Busan IPark)
 Índio (2008–2009 Gyeongnam FC, 2010–2011 Jeonnam Dragons)
 Luiz Henrique (2008 Suwon Samsung Bluewings, 2008–2012 & 2015–2016 Jeonbuk Hyundai Motors); also played in K League 2
 Anderson (2009 FC Seoul)
 Bruno Cazarine (2009 Gyeongnam FC)
 Dinho (2009 Gyeongnam FC)
 Fabio Luis (2009 Ulsan Hyundai Horang-i)
 Gilvan Gomes Vieira (2009 Jeju United)
 Jorge Luiz (2009 Suwon Samsung Bluewings)
 Jóbson (2009 Jeju United)
 Marcelo Pinheiro (2009 Gyeongnam FC)
 Ricardo (2009 Jeju United)
 Ricardo Costa (2009 Daejeon Citizen)
 Rogério (2009 Gyeongnam FC)
 Tiago Jorge Honório (2009 Suwon Samsung Bluewings)
 Vaguinho (2009 Pohang Steelers)
 Valdeir da Silva Santos (2009 Daegu FC)
 Wesley (2009 Jeonnam Dragons, 2013 Gangwon FC)
 Alexandre (2009–2010 Daejeon Citizen)
 Caion (2009–2010 Gangwon FC, 2018 Daegu FC)
 Fabricio Souza (2009–2010 Seongnam Ilhwa Chunma)
 Léo (2009–2010 Daegu FC)
 Válber Mendes Ferreira (2009–2010 Daejeon Citizen)
 Zacarias (2010 Daejeon Citizen)
 Santos (2010–2012 Jeju United, 2013–2017 Suwon Samsung Bluewings)
 Alexsandro (2010 Pohang Steelers)
 Anderson (2010 Daegu FC)
 Bruno (2010 Incheon United)
 Camilo (2010 Gyeongnam FC)
 Danilo Neco (2010 Jeju United); also played in K League 2
 Fábio (2010 Daejeon Citizen)
 Gomes (2010 Jeju United)
 Juninho (2010 Suwon Samsung Bluewings)
 Léo Mineiro (2010 Jeju United, 2017 Daegu FC); also played in K League 2
 Marcelo Brás (2010 Gyeongnam FC)
 Marcinho (2010 Gyeongnam FC)
 Márcio Diogo (2010 Suwon Samsung Bluewings)
 Reinaldo (2010 Suwon Samsung Bluewings)
 Renato Medeiros (2010 Gangwon FC)
 Zulu (2010 Pohang Steelers)
 Felipe Azevedo (2010–2011 Busan IPark)
 Lúcio (2010–2011 Gyeongnam FC, 2011 Ulsan Hyundai); also played in K League 2
 Jose Mota (2010 Suwon Samsung Bluewings, 2012 Busan IPark)
 João Maria Lima do Nascimento (2010 FC Seoul)
 Bergson (2011 Suwon Samsung Bluewings, 2015 Busan IPark)
 Celin (2011 Gwangju FC)
 Diego Oliveira (2011 Suwon Samsung Bluewings)
 Fábio Bahia (2011 Incheon United)
 Felipinho (2011 Jeju United)
 Jean Carlos (2011 Seongnam Ilhwa Chunma)
 Juninho (2011 Daegu FC)
 Magnum (2011 Ulsan Hyundai)
 Monato (2011 Gyeongnam FC)
 Tássio (2011 Busan IPark)
 Thiago Quirino (2011 Daegu FC)
 Vinicius (2011 Ulsan Hyundai)
 Vinícius Lopes (2011 Gwangju FC)
 Wagner (2011 Daejeon Citizen); also played in K League 2
 Wando (2011 Suwon Samsung Bluewings)
 Wésley Brasilia (2011 Daejeon Citizen)
 Héverton (2011–2012 Seongnam Ilhwa Chunma)
 Éder Baiano (2011–2012 Busan IPark)
 Éverton Santos (2011–2012 Seongnam Ilhwa Chunma, 2014–2015 FC Seoul, 2015 Ulsan Hyundai)
 Jair (2011–2012 Jeju United, 2016–2017 Jeonnam Dragons)
 Matheus (2011–2012 Daegu FC); also played in K League 2
 Roni (2011–2012 Gyeongnam FC)
 Fagner (2011–2014 Busan IPark)
 João Paulo (2011–2012 Gwangju FC, 2013 Daejeon Citizen, 2014 Incheon United)
 Elionar Bombinha (2011 Incheon United)
 Weslley (2011 Jeonnam Dragons, 2012 Gangwon FC, 2013 Jeonnam Dragons, 2015 Busan IPark, 2017 Incheon United)
 Alex Terra (2012 Daejeon Citizen)
 Dinélson (2012 Daegu FC)
 Alessandro Lopes (2012 Daejeon Citizen); also played in K League 2
 Éverton (2012 Suwon Samsung Bluewings)
 Henan Silveira (2012 Jeonnam Dragons, 2016 Jeju United); also played in K League 2
 Ivo (2012, 2014 Incheon United)
 Jael Ferreira (2012 Seongnam Ilhwa Chunma)
 Leozinho (2012 Daejeon Citizen)
 Lúcio Flávio (2012 Jeonnam Dragons, 2013 Daejeon Citizen)
 Nando (2012 Incheon United)
 Paulo (2012 Jeonnam Dragons)
 Paulo (2012 Incheon United)
 Renan Marques (2012 Jeju United)
 Robert (2012 Jeju United)
 Silva (2012 Jeonnam Dragons)
 Leandrinho (2012 & 2013 Daegu FC, 2014–2015 Jeonnam Dragons)
 Caíque (2012 Gyeongnam FC, 2013–2014 Ulsan Hyundai)
 Leonardo (2012–2016 Jeonbuk Hyundai Motors)
 Maranhão (2012 Ulsan Hyundai, 2013 Jeju United); also played in K League 2
 Rafinha (2012–2014 Ulsan Hyundai)
 Adriano Pardal (2013 Daegu FC)
 Fábio Santos (2013 Daegu FC)
 Rodrigo Pimpão (2013 Suwon Samsung Bluewings)
 Waldison (2013 Jeju United)
 Diogo (2013 Incheon United, 2014 Incheon United)
 Edcarlos (2013 Seongnam Ilhwa Chunma)
 Marcinho (2013 Jeonnam Dragons)
 Pedro Júnior (2013 Jeju United)
 Roberto César (2013 Ulsan Hyundai)
 Rodrigo (2013 Busan IPark)
 Rodriguinho (2013 Jeju United)
 Sandro (2013 Daegu FC)
 Thiago (2013 Incheon United)
 Thiago (2013 Jeonbuk Hyundai Motors)
 William (2013 Busan IPark)
 Rafael Costa (2014 FC Seoul)
 Marcos Aurélio (2014 Jeonbuk Hyundai Motors)
 Kaio (2014 Jeonbuk Hyundai Motors, 2015 Suwon Samsung Bluewings)
 Valdivia (2014 Seongnam FC)
 Nilson (2014–2015 Busan IPark); also played in K League 2
 Roger (2014 Suwon Samsung Bluewings)
 Reiner Ferreira (2014 Suwon Samsung Bluewings)
 Tartá (2014–2015 Ulsan Hyundai)
 Wander Luiz (2014 Ulsan Hyundai)
 Vinícius Reche (2014 Jeonbuk Hyundai Motors)
 Jacio (2014 Busan IPark)
 Thiago Alagoano (2014 Jeju United)
 Adriano (2015 Daejeon Citizen, 2015–2016 & 2020 FC Seoul, 2018–2019 Jeonbuk Hyundai Motors); also played in K League 2
 Fábio Neves (2015–2016 Gwangju FC); also played in K League 2
 Wanderson Carvalho (2015 Daejeon Citizen, 2016 Jeju United, 2017 Pohang Steelers, 2018 Jeonnam Dragons, 2019 & 2022–present Pohang Steelers); also played in K League 2
 Tiago Alves (2015 Pohang Steelers, 2016 Seongnam FC, 2018–2019 Jeonbuk Hyundai Motors)
 Ricardo Lopes (2015 Jeju United, 2016–2019 Jeonbuk Hyundai Motors)
 Fernando Karanga (2015 Jeju United)
 Léo Itaperuna (2015 Suwon Samsung Bluewings)
 Ricardo Bueno (2015 Seongnam FC)
 Jorginho (2015 Seongnam FC)
 Lucas Pajeu (2015 Seongnam FC)
 Gilberto Fortunato (2015 Gwangju FC)
 Bill (2015 Busan IPark)
 Ricardinho (2015 Daejeon Citizen)
 Sassá (2015 Daejeon Citizen)
 Bernardo Vieira de Souza (2016 Ulsan Hyundai)
 Marcelo Toscano (2016–2017 Jeju United)
 Johnathan (2016–2017 Suwon Samsung Bluewings, 2021 Gwangju FC); also played in K League 2
 Célio Santos (2016 Ulsan Hyundai)
 Lulinha (2016–2017 Pohang Steelers)
 Muralha (2016–2017 Pohang Steelers)
 Maurinho (2016 Jeonnam Dragons, 2017 FC Seoul)
 Gerson (2017 Gangwon FC)
 Mazola (2017 Jeonbuk Hyundai Motors)
 Diego Maurício (2017–2018 Gangwon FC); also played in K League 2
 Magno Cruz (2017–2019 Jeju United)
 Wanderson (2017 Gwangju FC, 2018 Jeonnam Dragons); also played in K League 2
 Cesinha (2017–present Daegu FC); also played in K League 2
 Júnior Negrão (2017 Daegu FC, 2018–2020 Ulsan Hyundai)
 Evandro Paulista (2017 Daegu FC, 2018 FC Seoul)
 Mailson (2017 Jeju United)
 Anderson Lopes (2018 FC Seoul)
 Alemão (2018 Pohang Steelers)
 Getterson (2018 Pohang Steelers)
 Negueba (2018–2019 Gyeongnam FC, 2021–present Incheon United); also played in K League 2
 Tiago Marques Rezende (2018–2019 Jeju United)
 Cristovam (2018 Suwon Samsung Bluewings)
 Jean Carlos (2018 Daegu FC)
 Zé Roberto (2018 Daegu FC)
 Marcão (2018 Gyeongnam FC); also played in K League 2
 Waguininho (2018–2019 Suwon Samsung Bluewings); also played in K League 2
 Edgar (2018–2022, 2023–present Daegu FC)
 Éder (2019 Seongnam FC); also played in K League 2 ※ Dual citizen of Brazil and Palestine 
 Dário (2019 Daegu FC)
 David da Silva (2019 Pohang Steelers)
 Rildo (2019 Daegu FC)
 Osman Júnior (2019 Gyeongnam FC)
 Rômulo (2020 Busan IPark); also played in K League 2
 Felipe (2020–2021 Gwangju FC); also played in K League 2
 Willyan (2020 Gwangju FC, 2023–present FC Seoul); also played in K League 2
 Gustavo Vintecinco (2020 Busan IPark); also played in K League 2
 Murilo Henrique (2020 Jeonbuk Hyundai Motors, 2021–present Suwon FC)
 Jonatan Ferreira Reis (2020 Busan IPark)
 Gustavo (2020–present Jeonbuk Hyundai Motors)
 Gustavo (2020 Incheon United)
 Victor Andrade (2021 Suwon FC)
 Reis (2021 Gwangju FC, 2023–present Jeju United); also played in K League 2
 Gabriel Barbosa (2021 FC Seoul)
 Barros Tardeli (2021 Suwon FC)
 Bruno Lamas (2021–2022 Daegu FC); also played in K League 2
 Ricardo Silva (2022 FC Seoul)
 Zeca (2022 Daegu FC, 2023–present Pohang Steelers)
 Léo Souza (2022 Ulsan Hyundai)
 Daniel Penha (2022–present Daegu FC)
 Hernandes Rodrigues (2022–present Incheon United); also played in K League 2
 Jefferson Galego (2022–present Gangwon FC)
 Rodrigo Bassani (2023–present Suwon Samsung Bluewings)
 Marcos Serrato (2023–present Daegu FC)
 Lucas Barcellos (2023–present Daegu FC)
 Oberdan (2023–present Pohang Steelers)
 Luan Ferreira (2023–present Suwon FC)
 Rafael Silva (2023–present Jeonbuk Hyundai Motors)
 André Luis (2023–present Jeonbuk Hyundai Motors)
 Tiago Orobó (2023–present Daejeon Hana Citizen); also played in K League 2
 Leandro Ribeiro (2023–present Daejeon Hana Citizen); also played in K League 2
 Thomás Bedinelli (2023–present Gwangju FC)
 Sandro Lima (2023–present Gwangju FC); also played in K League 2
 Yuri (2023–present Jeju United)

Chile
 Jose Villanueva (2007 Ulsan Hyundai Horang-i)
 Hugo Droguett (2012 Jeonbuk Hyundai Motors, 2014 Jeju United)

Colombia
 Harry Castillo (2000 Suwon Samsung Bluewings, 2000–2003 Busan I'Cons, 2004 Seongnam Ilhwa Chunma, 2006 Gyeongnam FC)
 Tommy Mosquera (2003 Busan I'Cons)
 Milton Rodríguez (2005–2006 Jeonbuk Hyundai Motors)
 Mauricio Molina (2009–2010 Seongnam Ilhwa Chunma, 2011–2015 FC Seoul)
 Carmelo Valencia (2010 Ulsan Hyundai)
 Julián Estiven Vélez (2010–2012 Ulsan Hyundai, 2014 Jeju United)
 Mauricio Mendoza (2011 Gyeongnam FC)
 Javier Reina (2011 Jeonnam Dragons, 2012–2013 & 2015 Seongnam Ilhwa Chunma / Seongnam FC)
 Wilmar Jordán Gil (2011–2012 Gyeongnam FC, 2013 Seongnam Ilhwa Chunma)
 Anderson Plata (2013 Daejeon Citizen)
 Cesar Arias (2013 Daejeon Citizen)
 Manuel Palacios (2020–2022 Pohang Steelers, 2022 Seongnam FC); also played in K League 2

Ecuador
 Energio Díaz (1996 Jeonnam Dragons)

Paraguay
 José Ortigoza (2010 Ulsan Hyundai)

Uruguay
 Arsenio Luzardo (1992–1993 LG Cheetahs)
 Nestor Correa (2000 Jeonbuk Hyundai Motors, 2002 Jeonnam Dragons)
 Yari Silvera (2000–2001, 2003 Bucheon SK)
 Juan Olivera (2006 Suwon Samsung Bluewings)
 Federico Laens (2013 Seongnam Ilhwa Chunma)

See also 
 List of foreign K League 2 players

Notes

References

External links
K League Official website: Player Profile Index 
National football teams

 
Foreign Players
K League 1

Association football player non-biographical articles